Alan Tunbridge is an English artist, book dust-jacket illustrator and songwriter.

Life and work
Normally painting in oils, Alan Tunbridge has also designed a great number of book dust-jacket illustrations, mainly in Scraperboard.

Many of his songs have been recorded by the folk and Country blues singer and guitarist Wizz Jones. With Jones, Tunbridge ran the MOJO Folk club at the King's Arms pub in Putney, South London in the early 1960s. Often he wrote the words spontaneously to Wizz Jones' chord sequences. His songs are also in the repertoires of Ralph McTell, John Renbourn, Maggie Holland and others. McTell was inspired by Tunbridge's lyrics of the evocative "National Seven" to tread the road which bears this name down to the south of France. The title of Bert Jansch's biography Dazzling Stranger originated from the title of a Tunbridge song.

Tunbridge spent a number of years studying the teachings of the mystic G. I. Gurdjieff (the Fourth Way) with John G. Bennett at Coombe Springs, and later spent time with the Sufi teacher Idries Shah. In 1997 Tunbridge contributed illustrations to Shah's collection of folktales, World Tales, illustrating the story of Mushkil Gusha.

He lived in Sydney, Australia, for many years. He no longer writes songs. From 1999 to 2009 he focused on using his writing and design skills to help develop the Schizophrenia Research Institute in Australia, of which he was a founding Director. This commitment was undertaken because his eldest son became affected by the illness. He retired from this role in 2009 to pursue his painting activities and to write his autobiography, Noose of Light, which was published in 2015. He now lives in Ubud, Bali.

Recorded songs
Alan Tunbridge's recorded songs include:

 Dazzling Stranger
 See How the Time is Flying
 The Legendary Me
 When I Cease to Care
 Nobody Told You So
 Beggar Man
 Slow Down to My Speed
 Stick a Little Label on It
 Which of Them You Love the Best
 City of the Angels
 The Raven †
 Find a Man for You Girl
 Mary Go 'Round
 Deep Water †
 When You're Gone
 National Seven
 Second-Hand Mini-Me
 The Grapes of Life
 Massacre at Béziers
 Pictures
 Teapot Blues †
 Earls Court Breakdown

† jointly with Wizz Jones

References

External links
 

21st-century English painters
English male painters
English songwriters
Living people
Year of birth missing (living people)
21st-century English male artists